Barnaby Edwards (born 20 August 1969) is a British actor, writer, director and artist. He is known as a performer for the British science-fiction television series Doctor Who, in the role of a Dalek operator. He has also written, directed, produced or performed in over 80 Big Finish Doctor Who audio stories. Alongside frequent radio and voice over work, Edwards has narrated over 40 unabridged audiobooks for Audible.com and others.

Early life
Edwards graduated from the University of Exeter in 1991 with a degree in Fine Art and French. He subsequently went on to train at the Guildford School of Acting, where he won the Postgraduate Award for Acting in 1992.

Career
Edwards has worked in the theatre, television, radio and audio plays, as a director and writer.  Edwards is also an artist and his pictures hang in galleries and private collections across Europe as well as being exhibited widely within the UK. Following a successful show at the Blue Lias gallery in Lyme Regis, Barnaby was asked to form one third of the Three West Country Artists exhibition in 1998. The Kingfisher Gallery in Devon held a major exhibition of his work encompassing nearly thirty new paintings, and in 2006 he exhibited a selection of pieces at the FSA Summer Exhibition.

Edwards regularly lectures on art history and art techniques, both in Britain and farther afield. He has given talks on subjects as diverse as European Narrative Painting, Pastel Techniques, Victorian Sea Paintings, Life Drawing, and Greek and Roman Myths in Western Art. He also gives practical tuition both to individuals and to groups, including art workshops on landscape, figure and still life.

In 2010, Edwards set up Textbook Stuff, specialising in audiobooks of classic short stories and poems. Readers include Miriam Margolyes, Andrew Sachs, Peter Guinness, John Sessions, Nicholas Pegg and David Soul. The company distributes via iTunes, Amazon and other online distributors.

In November 2013 he appeared in the one-off 50th anniversary comedy homage The Five(ish) Doctors Reboot.

Beginning in 2016, Edwards narrated the audiobook editions of The Bernicia Chronicles, a series of historical novels by author Matthew Harffy.

Acting

Film
Children of Men – Ministry of Arts official
The Merry Wives of Windsor – John Rugby
The Plotters – Robert Keyes
Shadows of a Stranger – Marley's Ghost

Television
Doctor Who (BBC) – principal Dalek operator (2005 onwards)
Children in Need (BBC) – Dalek operator
Children's BAFTAs (BBC) – Dalek operator
Doctor Who Confidential (BBC) – as himself
Totally Doctor Who (BBC) – as himself
The Giblet Boys (cITV) – Jeweller
The Why Files (LIVE TV) – Hoax Interviewees
EastEnders (BBC) – Queen Vic darts captain
Thirty Years in the TARDIS (BBC) – Dalek operator
The Five(ish) Doctors Reboot – Himself

Theatre
The Merry Wives of Windsor – John Rugby (at Shakespeare's Globe and in LA & New York)
Season's Greetings – actor and artistic director
Hamlet – actor
Twelfth Night – actor
Macbeth – actor
The Amazing Tale of Good King Wenceslas and Sleigh Rider – actor
Rope – actor

Radio
Dick Barton – actor
The Father of English Football – actor
Dostoevsky – actor
Cultural Baggage – actor

Doctor Who audio plays (Fifth Doctor)
Loups-Garoux – Victor
The Eternal Summer – Vicar

Doctor Who audio plays (Sixth Doctor)
The Marian Conspiracy – Francois de Noailles
The Spectre of Lanyon Moor – Philip Ludgate
Assassin in the Limelight – The Traveller

Doctor Who audio plays (Seventh Doctor)
Bang-Bang-a-Boom! – Robot Waiter

Doctor Who audio plays (Eighth Doctor)
Storm Warning – Rathbone
Sword of Orion – Digley
The Stones of Venice – Pietro
Minuet in Hell – Scott
Shada – Professor Caldera
Horror of Glam Rock – Bendy Roger
Human Resources – Clive
Max Warp – Announcer
Brave New Town – The Voice
Grand Theft Cosmos – The Guardian
Sisters of the Flame – Galactinet
Hothouse – Newsreader
The Eight Truths – Newsreader
Worldwide Web – Newsreader

Other audio plays
Bernice Summerfield: Beyond the Sun – Leon
Bernice Summerfield: Walking To Babylon – John Lafayette
Bernice Summerfield: Birthright – John Lafayette
Cyberman: Scorpius – Paul Hunt
Cyberman: Fear – Paul Hunt
Cyberman: Conversion – Paul Hunt
Cyberman: Telos – Paul Hunt
Cyberman 2: Outsiders – Paul Hunt
Cyberman 2: Terror – Paul Hunt
Cyberman 2: Machines – Paul Hunt
Cyberman 2: Extinction – Paul Hunt

Directing

Television/film/video
Bacardi: The Making of a Commercial
The Dolphin Myth
In-store Credit

Theatre
Cinderella
Puss in Boots
Snow White and the Seven Dwarfs
Aladdin
The Winslow Boy
Office Suite
Absent Friends
English Sketches
Kicking Bardom
"Mad Men r Crazy"

Audiobooks (drama) 

 The Waringham Chronicles.

Textbook Stuff audiobooks (horror)
Charles Dickens: The Signalman & Other Ghostly Tales 
Bram Stoker: Dracula's Guest & Other Dark Tales 
Edgar Allan Poe: The Pit and the Pendulum & Other Macabre Tales 
M. R. James: Casting the Runes & Other Uncanny Tales 
Sheridan Le Fanu: Carmilla

Textbook Stuff audiobooks (poetry)
Edward Thomas: Selected Poems 
Christina Rossetti: Selected Poems 
Andrew Marvell: Selected Poems 
Robert Browning: Selected Poems 
The Brontës: Selected Poems

Textbook Stuff audiobooks (non-fiction)
Karl Marx & Friedrich Engels: The Communist Manifesto

Radio plays
The Phantom of the Opera (broadcast on BBC7)

Doctor Who audio plays (Fifth Doctor)
Exotron
Son of the Dragon
The Mind's Eye
The Bride of Peladon
The Haunting of Thomas Brewster
The Boy That Time Forgot
Time Reef
Return to the Web Planet
Castle of Fear
The Eternal Summer
Plague of the Daleks
Cobwebs
The Whispering Forest
Cradle of the Snake

Doctor Who audio plays (Sixth Doctor)
Doctor Who and the Pirates
Assassin in the Limelight
The Doomwood Curse
Paradise 5
The Wreck of the Titan

Doctor Who audio plays (Seventh Doctor)
Frozen Time

Doctor Who audio plays (Eighth Doctor)
The Chimes of Midnight (broadcast on BBC7)
Absolution
The Girl Who Never Was
Horror of Glam Rock (broadcast on BBC7)
Phobos (broadcast on BBC7)
Dead London (broadcast on BBC7)
Max Warp (broadcast on BBC7)
The Skull of Sobek (broadcast on BBC7)
Grand Theft Cosmos (broadcast on BBC7)
The Zygon Who Fell to Earth (broadcast on BBC7)
Hothouse
The Beast of Orlok
Death in Blackpool
The Book of Kells
Deimos
The Greater Good

Writing

Television/film/video
Bacardi: The Making of a Commercial
The Dolphin Myth
In-store Credit

Theatre
English Sketches
Kicking Bardom

Radio plays
The Phantom of the Opera (broadcast on BBC7)

Doctor Who audio plays (Fifth Doctor)
The Bride of Peladon
The Emerald Tiger

Doctor Who audio plays (Sixth Doctor)
The Wreck of the Titan

Doctor Who audio plays (Eighth Doctor)
The Beast of Orlok
The Book of Kells

Personal life 
Edwards' long-term partner is actor Nicholas Pegg. Guesting at the 2017 Pride Cymru event Who's Queer Now, a symposium celebrating the impact and influences of Doctor Who on LGBT people, the couple revealed that they were celebrating their 25th anniversary.

References

External links
Textbook Stuff
Barnaby Edwards Official Site
The Phantom Of The Opera audio play Official Site

Audio interview with Barnaby Edwards – Goodies Podcast 17

1969 births
Living people
English male television actors
English male voice actors
Alumni of the University of Exeter